The 2015 Czech Republic FIM Speedway Grand Prix was the third race of the 2015 Speedway Grand Prix season. It took place on May 23 at the Markéta Stadium in Prague, Czech Republic.

Riders 
The Speedway Grand Prix Commission nominated Václav Milík as the wild card, and Matěj Kůs and Josef Franc both as Track Reserves.

Results 
The Grand Prix was won by Tai Woffinden, who beat Jarosław Hampel, Maciej Janowski and Nicki Pedersen in the final. As a result, Woffinden extended his lead over Pedersen to six points in the race for the world title.

Heat details

The intermediate classification

References

See also 
 motorcycle speedway

2015 Speedway Grand Prix
2015 in Czech sport
Speedway Grand Prix of Czech Republic